The Amphitheatre of Lixus was a Roman amphitheater located in Lixus, a city north of the modern seaport of Larache. The amphitheater, much like Lixus itself, is largely in ruins.

History

Design and construction

Gladiatorial contests

Today

See also
 List of Roman amphitheatres

Sources

Roman sites in Morocco
Roman amphitheaters in North Africa